The 2002–03 Moldovan "A" Division season is the 12th since its establishment. A total of 14 teams are contesting the league.

League table

Note: Congaz and Haiduc-Unisport withdrew because of financial problems.

References
 Moldova. Second Level 2002/03 - RSSSF

External links
 "A" Division - moldova.sports.md

Moldovan Liga 1 seasons
2
Moldova